Salagena bennybytebieri is a moth in the family Cossidae. It is found in central Kenya. The habitat consists of dry submontane forests.

The length of the forewings is about 8 mm for males and 8.5 mm for females. The forewings are deep olive-buff with black reticulations. The hindwings are deep olive.

Etymology
The species is named for Dr Benny Bytebier who collected the holotype.

References

Natural History Museum Lepidoptera generic names catalog

Endemic moths of Kenya
Metarbelinae
Moths described in 2008